Rubén Royo Castillo (born 20 September 1987 in Vitoria-Gasteiz, Álava, Basque Country) is a Spanish footballer who plays for CD Alfaro as a midfielder.

External links

1987 births
Living people
Footballers from Vitoria-Gasteiz
Spanish footballers
Association football midfielders
Segunda División players
Segunda División B players
Tercera División players
Deportivo Alavés B players
Deportivo Alavés players
Écija Balompié players
CD Mirandés footballers
CD Tudelano footballers
Arandina CF players